The 8th European Athletics U23 Championships were held on 14–17 July 2011 in the Městský stadion in Ostrava, Czech Republic.

Russia topped the medal table with 20 medals in total, including 9 golds (after revision), before Great Britain, also with 20 medals, and Germany.

Medal summary

Men

Women

Notes: Darya Pizhankova of Ukraine originally won three medals in 100 m, 200 m and 4 x 100 m relay but was later disqualified for doping and stripped of medals. Ulyana Lepska who also ran in the winning relay was found guilty of the same offence.
Elena Arzhakova of Russia originally won two gold medals in the 800 m and 1500 m, but was later disqualified for doping and stripped of medals. The medal standings and record have been updated to reflect the reallocation of those medals.

Medal table

Participating nations
According to an unofficial count, 899 athletes from 42 countries participated in the event.

 (1)
 (8)
 (3)
 (21)
 (16)
 (11)
 (10)
 (9)
 (33) (host)
 (8)
 (15)
 (29)
 (66)
 (2)
 (69)
 (39)
 (12)
 (19)
 (3)
 (19/20)
 (8)
 (49)
 (15/17)
 (14)
 (2)
 (2)
 (1)
 (1)
 (25)
 (29)
 (65)
 (19)
 (27/30) 
 (58)
 (9)
 (7)
 (6)
 (47)
 (36/35)
 (24)
 (19)
 (43)

References

External links 

 
 Results

 
European Athletics U23 Championships
European Athletics U23 Championships
Sport in Ostrava
2011 in Czech sport
International athletics competitions hosted by the Czech Republic
2011 in youth sport